Ratuwamai is a municipality and rural town situated in south-eastern Terai in Morang district and Province No. 1 of Nepal. This municipality was formed merging six village development committee i.e. Sijuwa, Itahara, Jhurkiya, Mahadeva, Govindapur (Ward No. 1, 3, 4 and 7) and Baradanga (Ward No. 1, 4, 5 and 7) since March 2017. Total population is 55 thousand 3 hundred 80, area 142.15 km2 and the number of voters is 42 thousand 4 hundred. The main Occupation of this municipality is the Agriculture, most of the people earn money by farming. Sombare, Itahara, Laxmichock, Damravitta, Sijuwa, Sauntha, Shanichare, Govindapur, Kalyanpur and Jhurkiya are the most developing places in the Municipality. The borders are as following: East Jhapa District, West Sunawarshi Municipality and Pathari-Sanischare Municipality, North Urlabari Municipality and South Bihar State India.

Education 
Sauntha Higher Secondary School is one of the biggest schools in the municipality.

Rising Nepal Secondary Boarding School is a school located in Ward No. 6.

References

 
Nepal municipalities established in 2017
Municipalities in Koshi Province
Municipalities in Morang District